The quadratic integrate and fire (QIF) model is a biological neuron model and a type of integrate-and-fire neuron which describes action potentials in neurons. In contrast to physiologically accurate but computationally expensive neuron models like the Hodgkin–Huxley model, the QIF model seeks only to produce action potential-like patterns and ignores subtleties like gating variables, which play an important role in generating action potentials in a real neuron. However, the QIF model is incredibly easy to implement and compute, and relatively straightforward to study and understand, thus has found ubiquitous use in computational neuroscience.

A quadratic integrate and fire neuron is defined by the autonomous differential equation,

 

where  is a real positive constant. Note that a solution to this differential equation is the tangent function, which blows up in finite time. Thus a "spike" is said to have occurred when the solution reaches positive infinity, and the solution is reset to negative infinity.

When implementing this model in computers, a threshold crossing value and a reset value is assigned, so that when the solution rises above the threshold, the solution is immediately reset to

References

Computational neuroscience
Mathematical modeling
Nonlinear systems